Roma Guy (born 1942) is an American LGBT- and women's-rights activist. She was born in Maine and earned a Masters in Social Work from the University of Maine, after which she worked in Africa for nine years. She is openly lesbian.

Roma and her partner Dianne moved to San Francisco in the 1970s. Roma also advocated for women's access to health care in San Francisco. She served for twelve years on the Health Commission City and County of San Francisco.

From 1994 to 2007 she worked as a professor in the Department of Health Education at San Francisco State University. As of 2017 she is the director of the Bay Area Homelessness Program.

In 2014 the San Francisco Health Commission adopted a "Resolution Recognizing the Life & Legacy of Roma Guy".

In 2018 she was chosen by the National Women's History Project as one of its honorees for Women's History Month in the United States.

Emily Skeggs plays the younger Roma Guy and Mary-Louise Parker plays the older Roma Guy in the 2017 miniseries about LGBT rights called When We Rise.

References

LGBT people from Maine
American LGBT rights activists
Lesbians
Living people
1942 births